Yeghipatrush, is a village in the Aparan Municipality of the Aragatsotn Province of Armenia. During the Soviet period, the town was renamed in honor of Askanaz Mravyan, Soviet Armenian Cultural Commissar.  The town has a 10th- to 13th-century church of Surb Astvatsatsin.  Some 100 meters beyond the church is an early cemetery with one corner of an allegedly 5th-century basilica as well as a khachkar shrine.

Gallery

References 

Kiesling, Rediscovering Armenia, p. 22, available online at the US embassy to Armenia's website
Yeghipatrush in istoka.com

Populated places in Aragatsotn Province